Amata cyanura  is a species of moth of the family Erebidae first described by Edward Meyrick in 1886. It is found on the Torres Strait Islands between Australia and New Guinea.

References 

cyanura
Moths described in 1886
Moths of Australia